Kay Kay Moe (born 9 September 1991) is a Burmese singer. She became popular after releasing her single song Kyun Ma from her album Kyun Ma. She won Female Singer Award of Most Requested Song from Shwe FM Facebook Page for 2018 in Shwe FM 9th Anniversary for this song Kyun Ma. She also won the Most Popular New Female Singer Award for 2018 in City FM 17th Anniversary for the same song.

Early life and education
Kay Kay Moe was born on 9 September 1991 in Yangon, Myanmar. She is third daughter of four siblings. Her cousin Chaw Su Khin is also a singer. She attended at University of Distance Education, Yangon.

Career
In 2010, she started her career by competing in Music Competition 2010, held by Myanmar Beer. In this competition, she competed against Aung Htet and other contestants. She also competed in Gita Dagar Lay Phwint Par Oo Music Competition and she won golden key.

In 2018, her debut album Kyun Ma was released and her single song Kyun Ma from this album was popular among audiences. On December 15, 2018, she won Female Singer Award of Most Requested Song from Shwe FM Facebook Page for 2018 in Shwe FM 9th Anniversary by this song Kyun Ma. On January 12, 2019, she also won the Most Popular New Female Singer Award for 2018 in City FM 17th Anniversary by the same song. She featured with song Maung Ma Ngo Ya Bu Naw in The Storm That Kissed Me film. 

In 2019, she also featured with song Ma Pyaw Pay Mae alongside Oak Soe Khant in the film The Greatest Love. She competed with Watermelon Mask in the first season of The Mask Singer Myanmar, aired on November 15, 2019.

In 2020, her second album Thu was released. On September 11, 2020, she sang the song Ma Sone See Khae Lay Thaw A Chit Myar at the music concert held in celebration of the 100th Anniversary of Burmese Film.

On November 13, 2020, she sang the song Alwan Sakar at the music concert held in celebration of the 100th Anniversary of Yangon University.

Discography

Album
 Kyun Ma (2018)
 Thu (2020)

Awards
Female Singer Award of Most Requested Song from Shwe FM Facebook Page for 2018 (Shwe FM 9th Anniversary)
Most Popular New Female Singer Award for 2018 (City FM 17th Anniversary)

References

External links
 

1991 births
Living people
People from Yangon
21st-century Burmese women singers